The 1981 Army Cadets football team was an American football team that represented the United States Military Academy in the 1981 NCAA Division I-A football season. In their second season under head coach Ed Cavanaugh, the Cadets compiled a 3–7–1 record and were outscored by their opponents by a combined total of 212 to 126.  In the annual Army–Navy Game, the Cadets played the Midshipmen to a 3–3 tie.

Schedule

Personnel

References

Army
Army Black Knights football seasons
Army Cadets football